The Party for a Non-Violent Society (SONOVI) is a small progressive political party in Burundi.

Political parties in Burundi